Collana Municipality is the seventh municipal section of the Aroma Province in the  La Paz Department, Bolivia. Its seat is Collana.

References 

 Instituto Nacional de Estadística de Bolivia

Municipalities of La Paz Department (Bolivia)